Loose Parts is a daily single panel comic strip drawn by Dave Blazek since April 20, 1998.  It is similar in tone, content, and style to The Far Side, drawn by Gary Larson, involving Theatre of the Absurd-style themes and characters. Loose Parts is syndicated by The Washington Post Writers Group and appears in newspapers across the country and overseas. Loose Parts was nominated for Best Newspaper Panel Cartoon division award in the 2010 National Cartoonists Society Reuben Awards.

History 
Loose Parts began in 1999 as a collaborative effort between Dave Blazek (the writer) and John Gilpin (the illustrator). Both men worked in the marketing department at The Philadelphia Inquirer and Philadelphia Daily News. In 2001 Gilpin stopped drawing for the single-panel cartoon and Blazek took up those duties as well; he now writes and draws for the cartoon.

Collections 
 Attack of the Chortling Stomach (2011) 
 Weird Things in Small Boxes (2008) – 
 Two Hundred Some Odd Cartoons (2006) – 
 Parts of My Brain (2003) – 
 Loose Upon The World (2001) –

References

External links 
 comicspage.com
 loosepartscomic.com

American comic strips
1998 comics debuts
Gag-a-day comics